Alexis Sharangabo (born 9 November 1978) is a retired Rwandan middle-distance runner who specialised in the 1500 metres. He represented his country at two Summer Olympics, in 1996 and 2000, failing to reach semifinals.

Collegiately, Sharangabo competed for Brevard College in Brevard, North Carolina winning the 2000 NAIA Men's Cross Country Championship individual title and graduating in 2003. He was inducted into the Brevard College Hall of Fame in 2014.

Competition record

1Did not finish in the final

Personal bests
Outdoor
800 metres – 1:49.35 (Nassau 1999) NR
1500 metres – 3:38.16 (Palo Alto 2000) NR
One mile – 3:57.82 (Falmouth 2000)
Indoor
1500 metres – 3:49.81 (Maebashi 1999) NR

References

1978 births
Living people
Burundian male middle-distance runners
Rwandan male middle-distance runners
Athletes (track and field) at the 1996 Summer Olympics
Athletes (track and field) at the 2000 Summer Olympics
Olympic athletes of Rwanda
World Athletics Championships athletes for Rwanda
Athletes (track and field) at the 1999 All-Africa Games
African Games competitors for Rwanda